Sathiyasangaree "Gary" Anandasangaree  is a Sri Lankan Tamil Canadian lawyer, human rights activist  and politician. He was elected to represent the riding of Scarborough—Rouge Park in the House of Commons in the 2015 federal election.

Early life and family
Anandasangaree is the son of V. Anandasangaree, a leading Sri Lankan Tamil politician. His parents separated in 1980 and he and his mother moved to Ireland. They had planned to return to Sri Lanka in July 1983 when the Black July anti-Tamil riots broke out. Changing plans, Anandasangaree and his mother travelled to Canada on August 31, 1983. Anandasangaree is estranged from his father and has only met him twice since 1983.

After high school Anandasangaree attended Carleton University, graduating in 1996 with a B.A. honours degree in political science. He is married to Harini Sivalingam. They have two daughters.

Career
Anandasangaree worked in real estate as a registered real estate broker between 1996 and 2006.

Anandasangaree studied at the Osgoode Hall Law School, the law faculty of York University. He graduated in 2005 with a LL.B. degree and was called to the bar in 2006. Anandasangaree is the principal lawyer at Gary Anandasangaree and Associates, a Toronto law firm specialising in business, real estate and international human rights law. He is a member of The Law Society of Upper Canada, Canadian Bar Association, Ontario Bar Association and South Asian Bar Association.

Anandasangaree has served on various community groups: Canadian Tamils’ Chamber of Commerce (president); Canadian Tamil Congress (counsel); Canadian Tamil Youth Development Centre (chairman); Newcomer Grants for the United Way of Greater Toronto (member); Toronto Board of Trade (member); Toronto City Summit’s Emerging Leaders Network (member); and Youth Challenge Fund (board member). He has also lectured at the Centennial College Centre for Small Business and Entrepreneurship. He has received the Queen Elizabeth II Golden Jubilee Medal and Queen Elizabeth II Diamond Jubilee Medal. He has also been awarded the TREB Award and Henry Marshall Tory Award for Service.

Anandasangaree has been a vocal campaigner against human rights abuses during the Sri Lankan Civil War and has attended several sessions of the United Nations Human Rights Council. This has led to Sinhalese Buddhist nationalists labelling Anandasangaree as a member of the militant Liberation Tigers of Tamil Eelam (LTTE). However, LTTE supporters openly backed Anandasangaree's conservative opponent during the 2015 federal election campaign.

Politics
Anandasangaree became active in politics after joining the Liberal Party. In October 2013 Anandasangaree announced that he would be seeking the Liberal Party nomination for the Scarborough—Rouge Park for the 2015 federal election. He won the nomination election held in August 2014. He won the election held on October 19, 2015, securing 29,906 votes (60.1%).

Anandasangaree continued his advocacy for Human Rights in parliament, speaking on International Human Rights Day about welcoming Syrian refugees and an Iranian scholar (Dr. Hossein Raessi) who was protected due to a joint program between Carleton University and University of Ottawa.

Anandasangaree sat on the Aboriginal Affairs and Northern Development committee in the 42nd Canadian Parliament.

On December 3, 2021, Anandasangaree was appointed Parliamentary Secretary to the Minister of Justice and Attorney General of Canada.

Electoral record

References

External links

Activists from Toronto
Canadian activists
Canadian people of Sri Lankan Tamil descent
Carleton University alumni
Lawyers in Ontario
Living people
Liberal Party of Canada MPs
Members of the House of Commons of Canada from Ontario
Osgoode Hall Law School alumni
People from Scarborough, Toronto
Politicians from Toronto
Sri Lankan emigrants to Canada
Sri Lankan Tamil activists
Sri Lankan Tamil lawyers
Sri Lankan Tamil politicians
21st-century Canadian politicians
Canadian politicians of Sri Lankan descent
Year of birth missing (living people)
People from Markham, Ontario